2 Days in New York is a 2012 romantic comedy film co-written and directed by Julie Delpy. It is a sequel to Delpy's 2007 film 2 Days in Paris.

Plot
Parisian Marion is living in New York with her son, in order to be closer to Jack, the boy's father (Marion's ex-boyfriend from 2 Days in Paris). She and her new boyfriend Mingus have a cozy relationship until the arrival of Marion's father, sister and sister's boyfriend, on vacation from France. The group's two days together are tested by "unwitting racism and sexual frankness", with no one left unscathed.

Cast
 Julie Delpy as Marion
 Chris Rock as Mingus Robinson
 Albert Delpy as Jeannot, Marion's father
 Alexia Landeau as Rose, Marion's sister
 Alex Nahon as Manu, Rose's boyfriend
 Malinda Williams as Elizabeth Robinson, Mingus's sister
 Arthur French as Lee Robinson, Mingus's father
 Kate Burton as Bella
 Dylan Baker as Ron
 Daniel Brühl as The Oak Fairy
 Vincent Gallo as himself

Albert Delpy is Julie Delpy's real-life father.

Festival and theatrical releases
2 Days in New York premiered at the Sundance Film Festival on 23 January 2012. The film was screened at the Tribeca Film Festival on 26 April 2012 and at the Seattle International Film Festival on 21 May 2012.

2 Days in New York was released theatrically in France on 28 March 2012, in the United Kingdom on 18 May 2012, and in the United States on 10 August 2012.

Following the film's Sundance premiere, distribution rights in Scandinavian and Baltic countries were acquired by Stockholm-based NonStop Entertainment.

Reception
According to Steve Rose of The Guardian, "Delpy's alter ego Marion" is a "lovable mess of neurotic babble, intellectual uncertainty and unmanageable lies"; the film is a "delightfully eccentric comedy,...big on laughs, low on pretense, exaggerated but emotionally sincere—not least in Delpy's dealing with the death of her mother (in real life as well as in the movie). We've rarely seen comedy this smart since Woody Allen and Seinfeld left New York."  Total Film's Neil Smith said the film is a "haphazard meditation on Franco-American relations, which hurls screwball situations, oddball cameos and the odd one-liner liberally at the screen without much caring if any of them stick." Smith concludes "what it all adds up to is an anything goes take on modern relationships with a side order of broad stereotype. Expect to be amused and bemused in equal quantities and you'll be amply entertained."

References

External links

 
 
 
 
 
 2 Days in New York at BehaveNet Movies

2012 films
2012 multilingual films
2012 romantic comedy-drama films
2010s English-language films
2010s French films
2010s French-language films
2010s German films
Belgian multilingual films
Belgian romantic comedy-drama films
English-language Belgian films
English-language French films
Foreign films set in the United States

English-language German films
Films about interracial romance
Films directed by Julie Delpy
Films set in Manhattan
Films shot in New York City
Films with screenplays by Julie Delpy
French films set in New York City
French multilingual films
French romantic comedy-drama films
French sequel films
French-language Belgian films
French-language German films
German multilingual films
German romantic comedy-drama films
German sequel films
Protozoa Pictures films